Sam Ingram (born 21 August 1985) is a British Paralympic Judo competitor who represented the United Kingdom at the 2008 Summer Paralympics in Beijing and at the 2012 Summer Paralympics in London.

Personal history
Ingram was born in 1985. Originally from Coventry, Ingram and his brother, Joe, were both born with the genetic eye condition corneal dystrophy, meaning they cannot see in colour and have no central vision. He attended the Alderman Callow school in Coventry before moving to Exhall Grange, a specialist school for visually impaired students. Ingram; the purple house at the school is named after him. After leaving the school he attended University College Falmouth to study broadcasting.

Judo career
Ingram was inspired to take up judo by his brother, who competed in the martial art at university. He represented Great Britain at the 2008 Paralympics in Beijing, where he won a bronze medal. He also competed at the 2007 IBSA World Championships in Brazil, where he picked up a silver. He won a silver again in 2010, and competed in the European Championships in 2011, winning a gold on that occasion. He won a silver at the 2012 Summer Paralympics.

In the run up to the 2016 Summer Paralympics in Rio, Ingram competed in the 2015 IBSA European Judo Championships in Portugal. There he secured a bronze medal in his -90 kg with a win against Russia's Vladimir Fedin in the third spot decider.

References

External links
Sam Ingram at Channel4.com

1985 births
Living people
People educated at Exhall Grange School
English male judoka
Paralympic martial artists of Great Britain
Paralympic bronze medalists for Great Britain
Judoka at the 2008 Summer Paralympics
Judoka at the 2012 Summer Paralympics
Medalists at the 2008 Summer Paralympics
Medalists at the 2012 Summer Paralympics
Paralympic silver medalists for Great Britain
Paralympic medalists in judo
Paralympic judoka of Great Britain